Vaagri Booli is an unclassified tribal Indo-Aryan language of southern India. It is not closely related to Hindi or Marathi. Hakkipikki and other local names for the people mean 'bird catchers'.

References

Languages of India